One Too Many is a 1916 American silent film starring Oliver Hardy.

Plot
Plump wakes with a hangover. He finds a note under the door from his uncle saying he will visit him "and his wife and baby" at 2 o'clock. It is 11am and he has no wife and baby. He is staying in a hotel. The bellboy is trying to take a heavy trunk upstairs. He gives the bellboy $50 to find him a baby. He finds a toddler in another room and is then asked to find a wife. Plump's friend Roy enters the room with the child and moves the child. The bellboy bribes the janitor's wife to play Plump's wife. He goes outside and hires a baby from a woman.

Meanwhile Plump finds the first baby and takes it back. The bellboy is collecting children including a little black girl. The first child's mother returns and finds her child with Plump. She takes him away but Roy steals it again. He hides in a cupboard. The bellboy brings a cot up and Plump pays him to "be the baby". Uncle John arrives as Plump is shaving he stubble off his baby. The child starts crying from he cupboard... then the wives begin to appear.

Cast
 Oliver Hardy as Plump (as Babe Hardy)
 Billy Ruge as Runt
 Billy Bletcher as Unhappy Boarder
 Joe Cohen
 Edna Reynolds as Newlywed
 Madelyn Hardy as Woman on street

See also
 List of American films of 1916
 Oliver Hardy filmography

References

External links

 Film at the Internet Archive

1916 films
American silent short films
American black-and-white films
1916 comedy films
1916 short films
Silent American comedy films
Articles containing video clips
American comedy short films
1910s American films